Adekar is a town and municipality (baladiyah) in northern Algeria. It contains the settlements of Adekar, Ali-Thoum, Tizi Lqarne, Djebla, Kebouche, Tizi Ougueni, Ighil Laqrun, Timri Mahmoud, Mechnouh, Ikhetaben, Halafa, Thighzert, Thimri Mahmoud, Thazrut, Hanguedh, Ait Malek, Hriz, Kiria, Ait Yahia Youcef, Aoughled, Ait maamar, Ait yidir, Aguemoun,I ksilen, Ighzer Abas, Thakamra. Grounia, Hathou, Tala Hemdoun, Jebroune, and Adhoukar.

Communes of Béjaïa Province